Thomas Edward Bing (24 November 1931 – 18 May 2015) was an English professional footballer who played for Margate and Tottenham Hotspur.

Football career
Bing was born in Broadstairs and  made his debut for Margate reserves in December 1947. The winger played in a total of 37 matches and scored four goals in his first spell with the Kent League club. After impressing Spurs boss Bill Nicholson, the White Hart Lane club paid a four figure sum for his services in September 1954. Bing featured mainly in the club's reserve side and made only one senior appearance in a 3-2 reverse at Bolton Wanderers on 19 October 1957. In July 1959 he returned to his former club and went on to participate in a further 39 matches and netting seven goals.

Post-football
Outside of football, Bing supplemented his earnings by working as a plumber. Bing died on 18 May 2015.

References

External links
Tottenham Hotspur F.C A-Z of players Retrieved 29 November 2012 
Bing fact file

1931 births
People from Broadstairs
English footballers
English Football League players
Margate F.C. players
Tottenham Hotspur F.C. players
2015 deaths
Association football wingers
Kent Football League (1894–1959) players